Patsuia is a butterfly genus of the Limenitidinae subfamily. The genus is confined to western China and Tibet. It is monotypic, containing the single species Patsuia sinensium.

References
"Patsuia Moore, [1898]" at Markku Savela's Lepidoptera and Some Other Life Forms

Limenitidinae
Monotypic butterfly genera
Taxa named by Frederic Moore
Nymphalidae genera